Clan Gillanders, also known in Scottish Gaelic as Clann Ghille Ainnriais, is a Scottish clan whose genealogy is preserved in the 15th-century manuscript MS 1467.

MS 1467

Transcriptions and translations

Summary
According to this manuscript, the clan's chief was Paul Mactire, a man who appears in contemporary records in the 1360s. The manuscript records that Paul's 3rd great-grandfather was Gillanders, who was in turn eight generations in descent from Gilleoin of the Aird, who is also recorded within as the progenitor of the Mackenzies and the Mathesons. Gilleoin of the Aird is thought to have flourished around 1140, and is thought to have governed a large expanse of land in the north of Scotland, independent of the 12th century mormaers of Moray. According to Alexander Grant, he is likely to have filled the vacuum in southern Ross, left by the reduction of Norse power in the later part of the 11th century.

According to Skene, this manuscript shows that Paul descended from a brother of Fearchar, Earl of Ross. W.D.H. Sellar pointed out that there are too many generations between Paul and Gilleoin of the Aird. Sellar considered that the genealogy combined the descendants of Gilleoin of the Aird with the ancestors of Paul; thus, that the genealogy should actually start with the Paul who appears in the manuscript as Gillander's grandfather. However, according to William Matheson, it is possible that this Paul is Páll Bálkason, a 13th-century sheriff of Skye. Matheson considered that Páll Bálkason's father was an ancestor of the MacPhails, MacKillops, and the MacLeods.

The personal name Gillanders is an Anglicised form of a Gaelic name meaning "the servant of (St) Andrew". The Gaelic name was a common one in mediaeval Scotland. According to Grant, there are two men who appear in contemporary records in the 13th century, that may belong to the clan. These men are Gillanders MacIsaac, and Isaac MacGillanders, who are thought to be father and son. According to Grant, since Gillanders MacIsaac flourished in about 1231, this could make him a contemporary of the Gillanders recorded in the manuscript, and possibly could mean they are the same individual. Grant suggested that the lands of Gillanders MacIsaac may have been on the Black Isle, or lower Strathconon, or around Dingwall.

Clan Ross

A 17th-century tradition stated that the daughter of Paul Mactire married a Ross of Balnagown, and from then on the Rosses were known in Gaelic as "Clan Leamdreis".

Notes

References
Footnotes

Bibliography

 

Clan Ross
Gillanders